TROPIK TV is a specialized children's TV channel based in Zenica, Bosnia and Herzegovina. The channel's name comes from sister company Tropik Film & Video which deals with the distribution of films, books and promotional media in Bosnia and Herzegovina.

The programming is aired in Bosnian, although the majority of series are broadcast with existing Croatian or Serbian dubs if those are available, and it is available via cable systems throughout Bosnia and Herzegovina.

Programming
 Ben 10
 Peppa Pig
 Masha and the Bear – Maša i medo
 Miraculous: Tales of Ladybug & Cat Noir – Miraculous: Čudotvorne pustolovine Bubamare i Crnog mačka
 Sid the Science Kid - Sid: dijete naučnik
 Splash and Bubbles
 Super Wings
My Little Pony: Friendship Is Magic – Moj mali poni: Prijateljstvo je čarolija

References

External links 
 Communications Regulatory Agency of Bosnia and Herzegovina

Television in Bosnia and Herzegovina
Children's television networks
Television stations in Bosnia and Herzegovina
Television channels and stations established in 2018
Companies of Bosnia and Herzegovina